Said Mustafov (born 13 March 1933) is a Bulgarian former wrestler who competed in the 1964 Summer Olympics and in the 1968 Summer Olympics. He competed in Men's light-weight wrestling.

References

External links
 

1933 births
Living people
Olympic wrestlers of Bulgaria
Wrestlers at the 1964 Summer Olympics
Wrestlers at the 1968 Summer Olympics
Bulgarian male sport wrestlers
Olympic bronze medalists for Bulgaria
Olympic medalists in wrestling
People from Targovishte Province
Medalists at the 1964 Summer Olympics
Bulgarian people of Turkish descent
20th-century Bulgarian people
21st-century Bulgarian people